Kaempferol (3,4′,5,7-tetrahydroxyflavone) is a natural flavonol, a type of flavonoid, found in a variety of plants and plant-derived foods including kale, beans, tea, spinach, and broccoli. It is slightly soluble in water and highly soluble in hot ethanol, ethers, and DMSO. Kaempferol is named for 17th-century German naturalist Engelbert Kaempfer.

Natural occurrence
Kaempferol is a secondary metabolite found in many plants, plant-derived foods, and traditional medicines. Its flavor is considered bitter.

In plants and food

Kaempferol is common in Pteridophyta, Pinophyta, and Angiospermae. Within Pteridophyta and Pinophyta, kaempferol has been found in diverse families. Kaempferol has also been identified in Dicotyledons and Monocotyledons of Angiosperms. The total average intake of flavonols and flavones in a normal diet is estimated as 23 mg/day, to which kaempferol contributes approximately 17%. Common foods that contain kaempferol include: apples, grapes, tomatoes, green tea, potatoes, onions, broccoli, Brussels sprouts, squash, cucumbers, lettuce, green beans, peaches, blackberries, raspberries, and spinach.  Plants that are known to contain kaempferol include Aloe vera, Coccinia grandis, Cuscuta chinensis, Euphorbia pekinensis, Glycine max, Hypericum perforatum, Pinus sylvestris, Moringa oleifera, Rosmarinus officinalis, Sambucus nigra, and Toona sinensis, and Ilex. It also is present in endive.

Biosynthesis

The biosynthesis of kaempferol occurs in four major steps:

Phenylalanine is converted into 4-coumaroyl-CoA
4-coumaroyl-CoA combines with three molecules of malonyl-coA to form naringenin chalcone (tetrahydroxychalcone) through the action of the enzyme chalcone synthase
Naringenin chalcone is converted to naringenin and then a hydroxyl group is added to form dihydrokaempferol
Dihydrokaempferol has a double bond introduced into it to form kaempferol

The amino acid phenylalanine is formed from the Shikimate pathway, which is the pathway that plants use in order to make aromatic amino acids. This pathway is located in the plant plastid, and is the entry to the biosynthesis of phenylpropanoids.

The phenylpropanoid pathway is the pathway that converts phenylalanine into tetrahydroxychalcone. Flavonols, including kaempferol, are products of this pathway.

Notes

External links 

Flavonoid composition of tea: Comparison of black and green teas 

 
Antidepressants
Xanthine oxidase inhibitors
Flavonoid antioxidants
Phytoestrogens
Progestogens